Death Proof is a 2007 American black comedy action-thriller film written and directed by Quentin Tarantino. It stars Kurt Russell as a stuntman who murders young women with modified cars he purports to be "death-proof". Rosario Dawson, Vanessa Ferlito, Jordan Ladd, Rose McGowan, Sydney Tamiia Poitier, Tracie Thoms, Mary Elizabeth Winstead, and Zoë Bell co-star as the women he targets.

The film was originally released theatrically as part of Grindhouse, a double feature that combined Death Proof with Robert Rodriguez's Planet Terror. After Grindhouse underperformed at the domestic box office, Death Proof was released as a standalone feature in other countries and on home media. It received mostly positive reviews for its stunt sequences and tribute to exploitation cinema, although its pacing was criticized.

Plot
Three friends, Arlene, Shanna and radio DJ "Jungle" Julia Lucai, drive down Congress Avenue in Austin, Texas, on their way to celebrate Julia's birthday. In a bar, Julia reveals that she made a radio announcement offering a free lap dance from Arlene in return for addressing her as "Butterfly," buying her a drink, and reciting a segment of the poem "Stopping by Woods on a Snowy Evening." Aging Hollywood stunt double Mike McKay trails the women to a bar and claims the lap dance. He notes that Julia is on billboards across town, and she is cold towards him. He returns to sit with the group and recites the line to Arlene. She is suspicious, having seen Mike's car earlier that day watching her outside a restaurant, but he convinces her to give him the lap dance.

The women prepare to depart with Lanna, another friend, to Shanna's family lake house. Pam, Julia's old classmate, is in need of a ride home and accepts Mike's offer. Mike takes Pam to his Hollywood stunt car, which is rigged with a roll cage, and tells her the car is "death proof." Once Pam is in the passenger seat, he reveals it is only death proof for the driver. He speeds and slams on the brakes, smashing Pam's skull on the dashboard, killing her. He catches up with the women's car and drives into it at high speed, killing them. Mike survives with no serious injury. Texas Ranger Earl McGraw believes that Mike killed the women intentionally, but because Mike was sober while the women were intoxicated, he cannot be charged.

Fourteen months later, three young women — hair and makeup artist Abernathy "Abbie" Ross, stuntwoman Kim Mathis, and up-and-coming actress Lee Montgomery — are driving through Lebanon, Tennessee, where they are shooting a film together. They stop at a convenience store, where Mike watches them from his car. The women are en route to pick up Abbie and Kim's friend, stuntwoman Zoë Bell, from the airport while Mike inconspicuously photographs them. Zoë tells them that she wants to test-drive a 1970 Dodge Challenger, the same type of car from the 1971 film Vanishing Point, that is for sale nearby. The owner lets them test-drive it unsupervised after Abernathy tells him that Lee is a porn star and will stay behind.

Zoë tells Abernathy and Kim that she wants to play a game they call "Ship's Mast," whereby she rides the hood holding belts fastened to the car while Kim drives at high speeds. Kim is hesitant, but agrees. The three enjoy the stunt, unaware that Mike is watching them. He rear-ends them in his car, causing Zoë to accidentally drop one of the belts. After several more collisions, he T-bones them, throwing Zoë from the hood. Kim shoots Mike's left shoulder, and he flees in his car. Abernathy and Kim cry over the loss of their friend, until Zoë emerges uninjured. The three agree to catch up to Mike and kill him.

Mike has stopped on a narrow road to treat his wound with whiskey. The women rear-end him at a high speed. Zoë gets out and beats him with a pipe, but he resists and drives off again. After a long chase, the women push Mike's car off the road. They drag him from the wreckage and beat him to death.

Cast

Production
During a night of drinking with his friend Sean Penn, Tarantino learned about "death-proofing" cars from Penn. Tarantino developed a fascination with the concept and the story for Death Proof developed from the way stuntmen would "death-proof" stunt cars so a driver could survive horrific, high-speed crashes and collisions. This inspired Tarantino to create a slasher film featuring a deranged stuntman who stalks and murders sexy young women with his "death-proof" car. Tarantino remembers, "I realized I couldn't do a straight slasher film, because with the exception of women-in-prison films, there is no other genre quite as rigid. And if you break that up, you aren't really doing it anymore. It's inorganic, so I realized—let me take the structure of a slasher film and just do what I do. My version is going to be fucked up and disjointed, but it seemingly uses the structure of a slasher film, hopefully against you."

According to Robert Rodriguez, "[Tarantino] had an idea and a complete vision for it right away when he first talked about it. He started to tell me the story and said, 'It's got this death-proof car in it.' I said, 'You have to call it Death Proof.' I helped title the movie, but that's it." Of the car chases, Tarantino stated: "CGI for car stunts doesn't make any sense to me—how is that supposed to be impressive? [...] I don't think there have been any good car chases since I started making films in '92—to me, the last terrific car chase was in Terminator 2. And Final Destination 2 had a magnificent car action piece. In between that, not a lot. Every time a stunt happens, there's twelve cameras and they use every angle for Avid editing, but I don't feel it in my stomach. It's just action." Death Proof marked Tarantino's first credit as a cinematographer.

Tarantino attempted to cast John Travolta, Willem Dafoe, John Malkovich, Mickey Rourke, Ron Perlman, Bruce Willis, Kal Penn and Sylvester Stallone in Death Proof, but none were able to work due to prior commitments. In an interview, Tarantino revealed that he cast Kurt Russell as the killer stunt driver because "for people of my generation, he's a true hero…but now, there's a whole audience out there that doesn't know what Kurt Russell can do. When I open the newspaper and see an ad that says 'Kurt Russell in Dreamer,' or 'Kurt Russell in Miracle,' I'm not disparaging these movies, but I'm thinking: when is Kurt Russell going to be a badass again?" Eli Roth, Planet Terror leading actress Rose McGowan, and Tarantino himself appear in the film. Roth flew in from Europe, where he was filming Hostel: Part II, to film his scenes, which took one day.

After being stunned by stuntwoman Zoë Bell, who worked as Uma Thurman's stunt double in Tarantino's earlier film Kill Bill, Tarantino wrote her the leading female role. This was her first on-screen acting role, which Bell initially thought was going to be merely a cameo. The character Zoë was based on the stuntwoman herself and includes small stories based around her real life experiences, some with Tarantino. It wasn't until she saw her name featured on the film posters opposite Kurt Russell, Rosario Dawson and Rose McGowan that she realized how big the role was.

Death Proof uses various unconventional techniques to make the film appear more like those that were shown in grindhouse theaters in the 1970s. Throughout the feature, the film was intentionally damaged to make it look like many of the exploitation films of the 1970s which were generally shipped around from theater to theater and usually ended up in bad shape. A notable example of one of the film's deliberate jump-cuts is seen at the beginning, when the title Quentin Tarantino's Thunderbolt is shown for a split second before abruptly being replaced by an insert with the title Death Proof, appearing in white lettering on a black background (exploitation films were commonly retitled, especially if they received bad press on initial release).

On the editing of Death Proof, Tarantino stated, "There is half-an-hour's difference between my Death Proof and what is playing in Grindhouse. […] I was like a brutish American exploitation distributor who cut the movie down almost to the point of incoherence. I cut it down to the bone and took all the fat off it to see if it could still exist, and it worked." An extended version of Death Proof was screened in competition for the Palme d'Or at the 60th Cannes Film Festival. Although publicized as 127 minutes long, this extended version is actually around 113 minutes. Tarantino is quoted as saying, "It works great as a double feature, but I'm just as excited if not more excited about actually having the world see Death Proof unfiltered. […] It will be the first time everyone sees Death Proof by itself, including me."

Music

The soundtrack for Death Proof consists entirely of non-original music, including excerpts from the scores of other films. It was released on April 3, 2007, alongside the Planet Terror soundtrack. Both albums featured dialogue excerpts from the film.

Release

Death Proof was released in the US and Canada alongside Planet Terror as part of a double feature under the title Grindhouse. Both films were released separately in extended versions internationally, approximately two months apart. The additional material includes scenes that were replaced in the American theatrical release version with a "missing reel" title card, such as the lap dance scene. A total of 16 minutes were added for this version. One of the first screenings of Death Proof was made at the Edinburgh International Film Festival on August 20, 2007, with star Zoë Bell attending the screenings.

The Dutch poster artwork for Death Proof claimed that the film would feature "coming attractions" from Robert Rodriguez. In the United Kingdom, Death Proof was released on September 21, 2007, and in Australia on November 1, 2007. Explaining the split in foreign releases, Tarantino stated, "Especially if they were dealing with non-English language countries, they don't really have this tradition … not only do they not really know what a grindhouse is, they don't even have the double feature tradition. So you are kind of trying to teach us something else."

Home media
Death Proof was released on DVD in the US on September 18, 2007, in a two-disc special edition featuring the extended version of the film; documentaries on the casting of the film, the various muscle cars, and Tarantino's relationship with editor Sally Menke; trailers; and an international poster gallery. On December 16, 2008, a Blu-ray Disc release of identical content followed.

A Japanese DVD release has the films Grindhouse, Death Proof and Planet Terror, with extras and fake trailers, in a six-DVD box set (English with optional Japanese subtitles). Death Proof was also released as a German HD DVD on December 15, 2008, believed to be the last film published in the now-defunct format. The Grindhouse double feature was eventually released on Blu-ray Disc in October 2010.

Reception
Death Proof earned a score of 65% on Rotten Tomatoes based on 43 reviews, with an average rating of 5.7/10; the site's critical consensus reads: "Death Proof may feel somewhat minor in the context of Tarantino's larger filmography, but on its own merits, it packs just enough of a wallop to deliver sufficiently high-octane grindhouse goods." The French magazine Les Cahiers du cinéma ranked Death Proof second best film of the year 2007.

Empire gave the film four out of five stars and a mostly positive review, describing the film as "Tarantino driving wildly under the influence" and "seriously entertaining". The BBC's Anna Smith said that while there was "fun to be had" with the film, "its imitation of a defunct, low-budget style of movie-making is perhaps too accurate when it comes to the genre's flaws", and gave the film three out of five stars. Roger Ebert gave Grindhouse 2.5 out of 4 stars, writing that while Death Proof was the more enjoyable half of the bill, it was still marred by overlong scenes of expository dialogue.

The Guardians Peter Bradshaw expressed admiration for the car crash scene, describing it as "a lethal roar of entertainment", but said that the film was padded with "long, long, long stretches of bizarrely inconsequential conversation […] which are a big comedown from the glorious riffs from Reservoir Dogs and Pulp Fiction", and that overall "Tarantino's twisted genius is there for all to see – but, it must now be admitted, all too briefly". Tarantino said at a director's roundtable, "Death Proof has got to be the worst movie I ever made. And for a left-handed movie, that wasn't so bad, all right?—so if that's the worst I ever get, I'm good."

In a 2012 interview, film critic Thom Andersen spoke about how Quentin Tarantino's movie, Death Proof, attempted to challenge the notion put forth by H. B. Halicki, director of The Junkman, that a good car chase must have obstacles. The idea behind this was to make it more difficult to film a sequel in a rural setting. Anderson specifically referenced the final scenes of Death Proof in which the chase takes place in a wide open space without any obstacles.

See also
 List of American films of 2007
 Quentin Tarantino filmography
 List of American films of 2008

References

External links
 
 
 

2007 films
2007 action thriller films
2007 independent films
2007 black comedy films
2000s serial killer films
American action thriller films
American chase films
American independent films
American serial killer films
Grindhouse (film)
American black comedy films
Films about automobiles
Films about stunt performers
Dimension Films films
Troublemaker Studios films
The Weinstein Company films
Films directed by Quentin Tarantino
Films produced by Elizabeth Avellán
Films produced by Robert Rodriguez
Films produced by Quentin Tarantino
Films set in Austin, Texas
Films set in Tennessee
Films shot in Austin, Texas
Films shot in California
Lebanon, Tennessee
Films with screenplays by Quentin Tarantino
2000s English-language films
2000s American films